Inoue is a Japanese surname.

Inoue may also refer to:

Inoue, forerunner to Icom Incorporated, international manufacturer of radio transmitting and receiving equipment
Inoue grappling, a form of mixed martial arts developed by Egan Inoue
Inoue house, one of the go schools of the Edo period
Inoue Rubber Co., Ltd. Japanese maker of tires
6637 Inoue, a main-belt asteroid